The Mod Cup (Scottish Gaelic Cupa a' Mhòid), also known as the Aviemore Cup is a trophy in the sport of shinty first competed for in 1969, traditionally played for by the two teams who are based closest to the host venue of the Royal National Mod.  The current holders are Aberdour.(2022)

Since 2018 there has been a women's trophy presented as well, this is also known as the LearnGaelic Challenge Cup. The current holders are Aberdour.(2022)

History

The Cup is presented by the Aviemore branch of An Comunn Gaidhealach as part of the week-long Mod as a celebration of shinty's links with Scottish Gaelic.  The trophy originally had a lid which has been lost. The first running of the cup was in 1969 as the Mod was held in Aviemore and the two closest sides were the sport's historic giants, Kingussie and Newtonmore. Newtonmore won the first running of the cup 5-2 and to this day the Mod Cup is perhaps the one trophy that the club is eligible to compete for that Kingussie has never won.

Over the years, the Mod has been held in towns without shinty teams which has resulted in teams being imported (Stornoway Mods in the 1980s, when Beauly Shinty Club and Skye Camanachd or in areas with a plethora of shinty teams, such as the Lochaber Mod 2007 when a select Lochaber East Side played Lochaber West in Ardnamurchan.  The expansion of shinty into areas where it had previously not been played for a long time means that there should be teams from that locale competing for the trophy in the future.  This was the case with the Caithness Mod in 2010 and the Western Isles Mod in 2011.

The 2004 fixture was played between Tayforth and Edinburgh East Lothian, at South Inch, Perth. The 2008 fixture was to be competed for between Aberdour Shinty Club and Glasgow Mid-Argyll at Little Kerse, Grangemouth as part of the Mod in Falkirk. However, the fixture was rained off.

The 2009 fixture was played between Lochside Rovers and Oban Celtic at Mossfield Park, Oban on 10 October 2009 as part of a normal league fixture which Lochside won. The Cup provides many smaller teams with an opportunity to win national silverware.

The 2010 fixture between Caithness and Sutherland was a historic game as it was the most northerly official shinty game ever played. Caithness won 3–1.

The 2011 final was played in Uist, and was contested between Uist and Lewis, with Lewis gaining revenge over their 2005 conquerors, winning 2–0.

In 2016 on the west side of Lewis, Skye recorded a 3–0 victory over their island rivals in wet and windy conditions. Goals from Peter Gordon, Iain MacLellan, and Kenny MacLeod took the Mod Cup over the sea to Skye.

Men's Winners 
2022 Aberdour 2 v Tayforth 2, Aberdour win on penalties, Perth
2021 Inverness 2 v Strathglass 2, Inverness win on penalties, Inverness
2020 No Competition due to Mòd Postponement
2019 GMA 0 v Bute 0, GMA win on penalties 3–1, Glasgow Green, Glasgow 
2018 Inveraray bt Col-Glen, Dunoon
2017 Kilmallie 3 v 2 Fort William, at An Aird, Fort William (played in 2018)
2016 Skye Camanachd 3 v 0 Lewis Camanachd, at Shawbost, Isle of Lewis
2015 Oban Camanachd bt Glenurquhart, at Mossfield Stadium, Oban
2014 Boleskine 4 v 2 Inverness, at Bught Park, Inverness
2013 Bute 1 v 1 Glasgow Mid Argyll, Bute won after penalty shoot-out, at Thornly Park Campus, Paisley
2012 Kyles Athletic 9 v 1 Bute, at Dunoon
2011 Lewis Camanachd 2 v 0 Uist Camanachd, at Uist
2010 Caithness Shinty Club 3 v 1 Sutherland, at Wick
2009 Lochside Rovers bt Oban Celtic, at Mossfield, Oban
2008 Match between Aberdour and Glasgow Mid-Argyll abandoned due to weather, at Grangemouth
2007 West Lochaber bt East Lochaber, at Ardnamurchan 
2006 Strachur & District bt Col-Glen
2005 Uist Camanachd 3 v 0 Lewis Camanachd, at Lionacleit
2004 Tayforth bt Edinburgh East Lothian, at South Inch, Perth
2003 Oban Camanachd bt Oban Celtic
2002 Kyles Athletic 1 v 0 Bute, at Largs
2001 Kyleakin Primary School 11 v 0 Back Camanachd, at Tarbert, Harris
2000 Kyles Athletic
1999 Fort William
1998 Skye Camanachd
1997 Strathglass
1996 Tayforth bt Strathclyde Police
1995 Caberfeidh
1994 Kyles Athletic bt Strachur 4-0 (not recorded on trophy) 
1993 Inveraray bt GMA 7–1, at Airdrie
1992 Oban Camanachd bt Oban Celtic 5–0, at Oban
1991 Caberfeidh
1990, No Competition
1989, Skye Camanachd 4 v 2 Beauly, at Bayhead, Stornoway
1988, Glenorchy bt Strachur, at Bishopbriggs
1987, Livingston bt Glasgow University
1986, Tayforth, at Peffermill
1985, Glengarry
1984, Inverness bt Boleskine
1983, Glasgow Mid-Argyll bt Strathclyde Police
1982, Skye Camanachd, at King George V Playing Field, Skye
1981, Lochaber won a tournament involving Invergarry, Fort William and Kilmallie
1980, Tayforth bt Livingston
1979, Lochcarron 5 v 3 Skye Camanachd
1978, Oban Celtic bt Oban Camanachd
1977, Glenurquhart 3 v 0 Beauly, at Brora, Sutherland
1976, Aberdeen Camanachd bt Aberdeen University
1975, Glasgow Mid-Argyll bt Kyles Athletic
1974, Aberdeen Camanachd bt Tayforth
1973, No Competition , game scheduled but no teams elected to play
1972, Lovat bt Inverness at Bught Park
1971, Glasgow Mid-Argyll (GMA)
1970, Oban Celtic bt Oban Camanachd, at Oban
1969, Newtonmore 5 v 2 Kingussie, at Aviemore

Women's Mòd Cup Winners 

2022, Aberdour bt Tayforth, 3-0, Perth
2021, Inverness bt Alba, Inverness
2019, GMA bt Bute, Glasgow
2018, Oban Lorn bt Cowal & Bute, Dunoon

References

Shinty competitions
Recurring sporting events established in 1969
Sports trophies and awards
1969 establishments in Scotland